Alba is an unincorporated community and census-designated place (CDP) located in Antrim County in the U.S. state of Michigan. The population was 287 at the 2020 census.

Located just north of Mancelona along U.S. Route 131, Alba is divided between Star Township on the east and Chestonia Township on the west.

History
Alba was first settled as a flag station named Cascade along the Grand Rapids and Indiana Railroad in 1876.  At the time, it was part of Forest Home Township, Michigan.  A post office opened on December 4, 1877, and the village was platted the next year.  The name was changed to Alba in 1884 after local entertainer Alba Haywood.

The community of Alba was listed as a newly-organized census-designated place for the 2010 census, meaning it now has officially defined boundaries and population statistics for the first time.

Geography

Demographics

References

Unincorporated communities in Antrim County, Michigan
Census-designated places in Michigan
Census-designated places in Antrim County, Michigan
Unincorporated communities in Michigan
Populated places established in 1876
1876 establishments in Michigan